The Italian Federation of Transport Workers (FILT) is a trade union representing workers in the transportation sector in Italy.

In 1970, the Italian General Confederation of Labour established the Italian Federation of Transport Trade Unions, which loosely grouped the Italian Federation of Hauliers and Inland Waterways, the Italian Railway Union, the Italian Federation of Civil Aviation Staff, the Union of Porters and Assistants, the Italian Federation of Marine Workers, and the Italian Federation of Port Workers.  In 1980, these unions merged into a reconstituted "Italian Federation of Transport Workers".

By 1998, the union had 130,692 members, of whom 38% worked in the rail industry.

General Secretaries
1980: Lucio Di Carlini
1986: Luciano Mancini
1994: Paolo Brutti
1997: Guido Abbadessa
2003: Fabrizio Solari
2008: Franco Nasso
2017: Alessandro Rocchi
2019: Stefano Malorgio

References

External links

Trade unions established in 1980
Trade unions in Italy
Transportation trade unions